Josephine "Josie" Ho Chiu-yi (born 26 December 1974) is a singer and actress from Hong Kong. She is the daughter of the Macao casino magnate Stanley Ho.

Acting career
She has played many roles, including portraying the parts of prostitutes, which were in strong contrast to  her own wealthy upbringing as a billionaire's daughter. For the film Exiled, Ho did not work with a script. Recalling the experience in a recent interview, she said of director Johnnie To, "[He] basically tells actors what to do ... Johnnie wants us to come to the set with our mind completely clean, like a white piece of paper. That way, he can draw whatever he wishes on us." Ho starred alongside Eason Chan in the Pang Ho-cheung directed slasher film, Dream Home.

In 2009, Ho along with husband Conroy Chan, and Andrew Ooi, co-founded 852 Films, a film production company.

Personal life
Ho is the youngest daughter of businessman Stanley Ho and Ho's second wife Lucina Lam. She has 3 older sisters and 1 younger brother, Pansy, Daisy, Maisy and Lawrence, as well as numbers of half-brothers and half-sisters.

In November 2003, Ho married musician-actor Conroy Chan Chi-chung in Australia.

She credits her oldest sister Pansy with supporting her early efforts to establish a singing career over the objections of their father.

Filmography

Television

Awards and nominations

Film Awards

References

External links
 
 Josie Ho at the Hong Kong Movie DataBase
 Official Josie Ho website 
 Josie Ho at Hong Kong Cinemagic
 Josie Ho at ChineseMov
 Josie Ho interview (video)
 The Establishing Shot talks to Josie Ho about Dream Home (video)
 Clifford Coonan: Hong Kong's poster girl is not your average heiress, Irish Times, 4 October 2011
 Alexandra A. Seno: Josie Ho: Tracking a star, from Hong Kong to Sundance, New York Times, 8 January 2008
 Johannes Pong: Billionaire heiress Josie Ho, hk.asia-city.com, 20 May 2010

1974 births
Living people
20th-century Hong Kong actresses
21st-century Hong Kong actresses
Hong Kong film actresses
Hong Kong television actresses
Hong Kong people of Dutch-Jewish descent
21st-century Hong Kong women singers
Ho family